The 2018–19 Central Coast Mariners FC season was the club's 14th season since its establishment in 2004. The club participated in the A-League for the 14th time and the FFA Cup for the fifth time.

Review

The Mariners were defeated in the first round of the 2018 FFA Cup by Adelaide United.

This season saw the appointment of Mike Mulvey as head coach following the departure of Paul Okon late in the previous season. Mike Mulvey lasted only until round 21 before becoming the forth coach sacked in 5 seasons. In the transfer window, the club re-signed two former players: all-time top scorer Matt Simon and New Zealand midfielder Michael McGlinchey. In pre-season, Jamaican Olympic sprint champion Usain Bolt also came to the club to train on an indefinite basis. Mulvey was sacked by the Mariners following their 8-2 loss at home against Wellington Phoenix. Alen Stajcic was named as caretaker to carry out the remainder of the season.

Background 

The Mariners ended the previous A-League season in last place after losing to F3 Derby rivals Newcastle Jets 8–2 on the final matchday. Paul Okon had stepped down as head coach late in the season and his replacement, Wayne O'Sullivan, had his contract terminated soon after season's end. Former Gold Coast United and Brisbane Roar coach Mike Mulvey was named as the new coach in April 2018.

Players

First team squad

Transfers

Transfers in

Transfers out

From academy squad

Contracts extensions

Technical staff

Squad statistics

Appearances and goals

|-
|colspan="14"|Out on loan:

|-
|colspan="14"|Players no longer at the club:

† = Scholarship or NPL/NYL-listed player

Pre-season and friendlies

Competitions

Overall

A-League

League table

Results summary

Results by round

Matches

FFA Cup

References

External links
 Official website

2018–19 A-League season by team
Central Coast Mariners FC seasons